Thapelo Mokhele (born 18 April 1986) is a Mosotho footballer defender.

Club career
Mokhele currently plays at the club level for Matlama FC.

International career
He has also won 17 caps and scored one goal for the Lesotho national football team since 2006.

International goals
Scores and results list Lesotho's goal tally first.

References

External links

Association football defenders
Lesotho footballers
Lesotho international footballers
1986 births
Living people